Saturn is a progressive rock band from Islamabad, Pakistan, formed in 2003. The group was founded by lead guitarist and songwriter Salman Zaidi and vocalist & lyricist Shahbaz Zaidi, who were later joined by bassist Aashir, drummer Shahbaz Asad, and rhythm guitarist Usman Ahmad Khan.
The band is well known for being one of the pioneering progressive rock groups in Pakistan. Saturn became famous after releasing their debut track "Raakh" which is Urdu for "Ashes". They later gained more popularity for their energetic performances and stage presence. Saturn is known as one of the loudest bands of Pakistan. Their debut album Naya Din was released on April 7, 2013.

History

Formation (2003-2005) 
Saturn was formed by brothers Salman and Shahbaz in 2003 and was joined by Hasham Kazi with whom they started recording "Raakh," their debut track, at S & M Studios Islamabad. Hasham left the band due to personal reason shortly after the release of the song and the two brothers moved on. In 2004 Saturn released their second song with a completely new line up and started playing concerts regularly until late 2005. In the start of 2006 Saturn disbanded and the band went into idle years.  From 2006 to 2007 Saturn remained out of the music scene, occasionally performing at music festivals, but not playing many concerts. It was later revealed that the band had been working on their debut album Naya Din.

The Comeback and Recording of Naya Din (2008-2012) 
In 2008 Saturn announced that they were back and now in studio to record their untitled album with Sarmad Ghafoor at S & M Studio. In 2008 Saturn played almost forty concerts for U ROCK, a project run by Ufone Telecom of Pakistan. The band's line-up had again changed but this time they were not willing to change it and went straight to studio. On July 7, 2011 Saturn finally released the long-awaited video for their second song "Kuch Nahi" and later that same year announced on radio that they were ready for their debut album’s release which was still untitled. It took almost three years to record all the songs but in December 2011 they announced that the album would be called Naya Din.

Naya Din and Rise to fame (2012-present) 
In 2012 Saturn collaborated with Kuch Khaas, a non-profit organization, and released a song with video called "Kuch Khaas". Saturn was working on the album art and release and marketing plans of the album throughout 2012. The band often stated on radio channels that they were about to release their album which was done with recording and was being mixed and mastered. On 22 March 2013 Saturn released their song and video named "Sargoshian" which is Urdu for "Whispers". A lyrical and subtitled video of "Sargoshian" was released three days prior to the release of the actual video. On 25 March 2013 Saturn released a teaser announcing the upcoming release of their debut album Naya Din.

Awards, achievements and nominations 

 Saturn's song "Raakh" was downloaded more than 150,000 times in 2003-2004.
 Saturn's song "Sargoshian" was nominated for best video of 2013 on Jeet Awards by Radio One Fm 91.
 Saturn's album Naya Din was nominated under the category of "Best Music Album of the year" in the Lux Style Awards 2014 by the name Sargoshiyan

Discography 

Studio albums

Naya Din (2013)

Track Listing for Naya Din 

 "Dhundla Aasmaan"
 "Main"
 "Talaash"
 "Kuch Khaas"
 "Kuch Naheen"
 "Duur Kaheen"
 "Sargoshian"
 "Raakh"
 "Naya Din"

Band members

Current members
 Shahbaz Zaidi - vocals (2003–present)
 Salman Zaidi - lead guitar (2003–present)
 Aashir Rayyan Khan - bass guitar (2003–present)
 Shahbaz Asad - drums, percussion (2007–present)
 Usman Ahmad Khan – Rhythm Guitars (2012–Present)

Former members
 Hasham Kazi – Lead guitars (2003)
 Khurram Aslam – Drums (2003–2006)
 Ali Umarkhitab – Rhythm Guitars (2004–2006)
 Awais Mohsin – Rhythm Guitars (2007–2008)
 Rawal Shadab Ahmad – Keyboards and Pianos (2010–2012)

Timeline

See also 
 List of Pakistani music bands

References 

 Saturn's Official Webspace
 Saturn's Interview on Koolmuzone.com
 Interview with the news tribe
 Saturn's words on Express tribune
 Saturn's Official Facebook Page
 Kuch Nahi video launch
 Saturn at Kuch Khaas Live
 Tracing silver linings in Dark Clouds 
 "‘Naya Din’ advocates for a new day"
 Saturn talking about Rock in Islamabad

External links 

 Saturn's Official Website
 Saturn on Facebook
 Saturn's channel on YouTube
 Saturn's Twitter Page
 Saturn on Vimeo

Pakistani progressive rock groups
Musical groups established in 2003
Musical groups from Islamabad
2003 establishments in Pakistan